Nidugal Cholas were a dynasty of chiefs who ruled parts of Karnataka during the 12th and 13th centuries.

Their stronghold was the hill fortress of Nidugal. The most famous among the line was Irungola deva Chola Maharaja (Irungola II) who had his capital at Henjeru. They were hostile towards the Hoysalas and resisted the latter but were subdued for a brief time during the reign of Vishnuvardhana. Later, they once again asserted their independence with the decline of the Chola and Hoysala kingdoms. They bore titles such as Lord of Uraiyur (the early Chola capital) and claimed descent from the legendary Chola king Karikala.  These Nidugal Cholas, they are claimed as descendants from the legendary Chola king of Karaikal & they bore titles such as Lord of Uraiyur ( Early Chola's capital )

This dynasty ruled parts of Karanataka during the 12th and 13th Century and they made this hill fortress as stronghold rule. It also frequently changed their capital – Henjeru (Penjeru) the present Hemavathi of Anantapur Dist. , after that got shifted to Nidugal and later to Govindawadi (Govindawada) of Anantapur district on the banks of the river Vedavathi.

As per the inscriptions, the King – Irungola deva Chola maharaja ruled this prosperous capital in the mid of the 12th Century.

But now one can see only the damaged and ruined fort and ancient temples, it is pathetic to see a once renowned and remarkable site which had glorified even before the Vijayanagara dynasty in this ruined state.

See also 
Irunkōvēl

References 

 httsps://terrainnexplorer.com/

Dynasties of India
Empires and kingdoms of India
Lists of Indian monarchs
Chola dynasty
History of Karnataka